Elections were held in Oxford County, Ontario on October 22, 2018 in conjunction with municipal elections across the province.

Oxford County Council
County council consists of the mayors of the municipalities plus two "city and county" councillors from Woodstock.

Blandford-Blenheim

Mayor

Township Councillors
4 to be elected, electors have multiple votes

East Zorra-Tavistock

Mayor

Township Councillors
Elected from multi-member wards

Ward 1

Ward 2

Ward 3

Ingersoll

Mayor

Town Councillors
5 to be elected, electors have multiple votes

Norwich

Mayor

Township Councillors

Ward 1

Ward 2

Ward 3

Ward 4

South-West Oxford

Mayor

Township Councillors

Ward 1

Ward 2

Ward 3

Ward 4

Ward 5

Ward 6

Tillsonburg

Mayor

Town Councillors
5 to be elected, electors have multiple votes

Woodstock

Mayor

The results for Woodstock City Council are as follows:

City-County Councillor
2 to be elected

City Councillor
4 to be elected

Zorra

Mayor

Township Councillors

Ward 1

Ward 2

Ward 3

Ward 4

References

Oxford
Oxford County, Ontario